Germany's Next Topmodel, Cycle 5 is the fifth season of the show that was aired on the German television network ProSieben. The show started airing on 4 March 2010. In difference to former seasons the show saw a significant change as the audition process was completely open this time whereas every model-wannabe got a chance to audition in front of the jury led by Heidi Klum. The winner was 19-year-old Alisar Ailabouni from Schalchen.

The international destinations for this cycle were set in Cape Town, Los Angeles, New York City and Milan.

Episode summaries

Episode 1: Großes Casting in Köln – kein Weg ist zu weit
Original airdate: 4 March 2010

Starting with 23.248 girls at an open casting the Cycle kicks off with an introduction of the two new judges Kristian Schuller, fashion photographer who has already been a responsible for several shoots on the show and Qualid "Q" Ladraa who impresses the applicants by his young looks. Stunt-Woman Miriam and Miss Russia-winner Anna carry the attention as does the forming relationship between Alisar and Nadine. After reducing the number of girls to 42 on the first day the remaining contestants are forced to sleep in a huge dorm in a hall next to the casting room. On their first individual audition in front of the judges the top 42 have to pose on their very first photo shoot having only four frames to impress the judges. After eliminating eleven more girls Heidi announced that the remaining contestants will be on their way to the very first destination of the Cycle.

Featured Photographer: Sven Schrader

Episode 2: Berlin, Berlin - wir fahren nach Berlin
Original airdate: 11 March 2010

While the best 31 girls from the casting are on their way to Berlin a catwalk challenge is awaiting on their way in the ICE-train from Cologne to Berlin in which the bottom two girls are eliminated halfway through. Arrived in Berlin the girls are taken to a photo shoot at Madame Tussauds where they have to pose with the wax figures of Robbie Williams and Johnny Depp where Svea impresses Heidi the most. At the Berlin Fashion Week the remaining girls are booked for the show of fashion designer Anja Gockel. Alisar closes the show in the obligatory bridal dress resulting in a very impressed reaction by the cheering audience. At the end of the show four more girls are eliminated leaving the top 25 in the competition.

Show opener: Miriam Höller
Show closer: Alisar Ailabouni

Episode 3: "Germany's next Topmodel" bekommt Zuwachs
Original airdate: 18 March 2010

The 25 remaining girls travel to the airport from Munich where Heidi promises that only 18 will survive at the end of the episode travelling to their first international destination of the Cycle. In a twist 19 year-old Pauline joins the other contestants as she was chosen by Heidi and "Q" to receive a Wildcard on the popular German entertainment show Wetten, dass..? much to the unwellbeing of Desirée and Svea who see her as their direct competition given their shared African heritage. At the challenge the girls have to split up in three groups to present a fashion show in Jeans, Glamour and Business look. Desirée, Amra and Chiara are eliminated before the next photo shoot which takes place on the baggage conveyor belt and is inspired by an advertising from Heidi. As being declared as the bests in the photo shoot Lara and Wioleta are declared as the first two finalists before the elimination begins while Kateryna already gets send home at the evaluation in front of the judging panel. While determining the 18 finalists Svea is sent home to the surprise of many in a direct face off with Pauline. In the end it is revealed that the next episode will take place in Cape Town where the international journey for the remaining contestants begins.

Featured photographer: Mayk Azzato

Episode 4: Fotoshooting mit Kristian Schuller in Kapstadt
Original airdate: 18 March 2010

Before the girls fly to Cape Town the viewers get informed about the withdrawal of Aline who did not get the permission from her school to take the time off to participate on the show any longer.

Quit: Aline Kautz

Having just arrived on their first international destination, the girls are immediately taken to a local casting agent who is advising the contestants how to appear and behave on future go-sees. In a sand-surfing challenge Lara emerges successful thanks to her sporty nature together with Hanna, who finally surprises the judges with some fresh attitude. On their very first casting the girls audition for South-African designer Malick. To the surprise of all, four girls are chosen to walk on his African-themed fashion show. They are Leyla, Miriam, Viktoria and Wioleta. Being in the city for an editorial shooting, the four former GNTM-winners appear as guests on the fashion show and later on visit the 17 finalists in their accommodation to give them advice for their upcoming journey. Judge Kristian Schuller photographs the girls in an impressive scenery on the South African beach. Due to their athletic abilities Miriam and Lara are able to deliver great postures while Cathérine and Lena once again struggle to amaze in their frames. The girls then fly to New York City where Heidi welcomes them and announced that the next decision is about to come up next. At the weekly judging panel Lena is the first to be eliminated for still being unable to follow the directions of the photographers and her blandness. Also eliminated is Petra for her blandness and lack of ambitions to improve.

Challenge winner:  Hanna Bohnekamp & Lara Emsen
Booked for job: Wioleta Psiuk, Leyla Mert, Viktoria Lantratova & Miriam Höller
Eliminated: Lena Kaiser
Bottom two: Luisa Kreuger & Petra Roscheck
Eliminated: Petra Roscheck
Featured photographer: Kristian Schnuller
Guest judge: Coco Rocha
Special guests: Barbara Meier, Jennifer Hof, Lena Gercke & Sara Nuru

Episode 5: Umstyling und Cop-Shooting - NY rocks!
Original airdate: 1 April 2010

At the beginning of the episode, several girls are worried about getting their hair cut. While Neele is rather unimpressed by her new given bangs, Hanna is pleasantly surprised about her dyed red hair and Laura, who got rid of her extensions, is curious about whether she will like her short hairstyle in the future or not. But it is Lara who bursts out in tears while getting her hair cut to a Bob-Hairstyle. 
Being split in groups of two, its Alisar who impresses the casting director and walks on the NY Fashion Week for Elise Øverland. Scouted by iconic casting director Jennifer Starr, five other girls get the chance to attend another casting for the FW in the next episode. At the photo shoot, the girls have to act as being caught by the police while coming out of a club. Passionate Jacqueline amazes Heidi when she breaks a light of a car while Hanna and Alisar once again struggle to come out of the shells. To the surprise of many, Lara is sent home at the weekly judging panel for her emotional outburst during the make-over.

Booked for job: Alisar Ailabouni
Eliminated: Lara Emsen
Featured photographer & guest judge: Marc Baptiste
Special guest: Jennifer Starr

Episode 6: Rodeo Drive, Beverly Hills & Sunset Boulevard
Original airdate: 8 April 2010

Booked for job: Leyla Mert, Alisar Ailabouni, Nadine Höcherl, Jacqueline Kohl, Hanna Bohnekamp & Neele Hehemann
Challenge winner: Viktoria Lantratova
Eliminated: Luisa Kreuger
Bottom two: Cathérine Kropp & Jacqueline Kohl
Eliminated: None
Featured photographer: Russell James
Guest judge: Tyson Beckford

Episode 7: Sport, jede Menge Feuer und Catwalk-Action
Original airdate: 15 April 2010

In this episode the girls were introduced to their new Runway-coach Jorge. The reward challenge included walking in front of the jury. The Top 3 could win a trip to a club opening. The third place was Hanna. Second place was Louisa with Laura being the winner, winning a dress. Then the girls attended a casting for Reebok for a television ad and an online promotion. The photoshoot included a fire shoot in front of the Los Angeles skyline. Cathérine was eliminated first, because of her shy and weak performance at the photo shoot. Later Nadine was eliminated for being not feminine enough.

Challenge winner: Hanna Bohnekamp, Laura Weyel & Louisa Mazzurana
Booked for job: Miriam Höller
Eliminated: Cathérine Kropp
Bottom two: Jacqueline Kohl & Nadine Höcherl
Eliminated: Nadine Höcherl
Featured photographer & Guest Judge: Rankin

Episode 8: Unangenehmer Besuch!
Original airdate: 22 April 2010

The girls were photographed by Swiss Michel Comte on a beach almost nude with just seaweed covering their bodies. As a support model Brooklyn Decker advised the girl on the shoot. While visiting her shop, the girls were automatically in a casting for jewelry designer Tarina Tarantino. Louisa and Jacqueline made the short list while Laura was chosen as the face for Tarantino's new campaign. Much to the surprise of the girls Eva Longoria was serving the dinner in her very own restaurant before joining the remaining eleven and Heidi for a chat. In the reward challenge the girls had to do a fake-commercial and photo shoot with a giant spider in which Neele won a shopping coupon worth of $750. On the runway lesson with Jorge Gonzalez Laura got the honor to walk in a huge Flamenco-inspired dress much to the concern of the other girls. It was also Laura that failed to do the runway at the weekly judging panel with a Phyton but it was Miriam who was sent home for failing to overcome her tomboyish behavior and work on her female appearance.

Challenge winner: Neele Hehemann
Booked for job: Laura Weyel
Eliminated: Miriam Höller
Featured photographer & guest judge: Michel Comte
Special guest: Brooklyn Decker, Tarina Tarantino, Eva Longoria

Episode 9: Heidi hinter der Kamera
Original airdate: 29 April 2010

In the reward challenge the girls had to walk an obstacle course with high-heels. The winner was Vikoria Lantratova. She won a laptop in Germany's next Topmodel style. Then the girls had a casting for Kimora Lee Simmons's urban fashion line Baby Phat. Louisa was surprisingly booked for the runway show despite being only 5 ft 7 in. The girls were photographed by Heidi Klum on a bed in lingerie. On the runway at the weekly judging panel, the girls had to walk in sexy outfits with a long garment. At the elimination Wioleta was sent home.

Challenge winner: Viktoria Lantratova
Booked for job: Laura Weyel, Leyla Mert, Louisa Mazzurana, Viktoria Lantratova, Alisar Ailabouni & Viktoria Lantratova
Eliminated: Wioleta Psiuk
Featured photographer: Heidi Klum
Guest judge: Kimora Lee Simmons

Episode 10: Hoch hinauf auf Highheels
Original airdate: 6 May 2010

The episode started with a runway lesson led by Jorge in which the girls had to walk in extreme high heels. At the reward challenge Alisar won jewelry while walking with her head being in a glass dome together with butterflies. Although only being the runner-up Pauline got some credit for her improvement. After that, the girls had a belly dance lesson with Heidi Klum and professional dancer Stefyana. In the weekly photo shoot the girls were photographed by Mathew McCabe in a nest impersonating birds that are hatching out of an egg. While Alisar delivered good photos with only 20 frames  both Viktoria and Jacequeline struggled. In a casting for a jeans company Louisa impressed with her charisma and the clients, while Pauline made such a good impression, that the clients overthought their planned '50s-pinup-girl concept for her. In a very close and split decision Louisa triumphed over Pauline. At the elimination Jacqueline was sent home.

Challenge winner: Alisar Ailabouni
Booked for job: Louisa Mazzurana
Bottom two: Leyla Mert & Viktoria Lantratova
Eliminated: None
Eliminated: Jacqueline Kohl
Featured photographer: Matthew McCabe
Guest judge: Katy Perry

Episode 11: Manege frei!
Original airdate: 13 May 2010

The episode started with the reward challenge, where the girls had to shoot photos of themselves in front of famous sights in San Francisco. The girls were divided into three groups: Golden Girls, Conductors and Hippies. The "Golden Girls" team won. Then they had a casting for the Sony PlayStation 3 SingStar 2010 FIFA World Cup ad. There they had to jump on a trampoline and sing Pink's "So What". Neele was criticized for her lack of concentration and Pauline was praised for her outgoing charm but it was Hanna who was eventually booked. Back in Los Angeles the girls had a surprise visit from Thomas Gottschalk who encouraged Pauline to fight her way through to the top 5 as he was responsible for her participation on the show. However at the weekly photo shoot, which was set in circus style and featured two elephants, she struggled due to her dress always revealing parts of her breast while she was moving. On the runway at the weekly judging panel, the girls had to walk with a little monkey. To the surprise of everyone Viktoria was sent home despite her supermodel-looks as she was, according to the judges, not able to show a strong enough personality which was required to become Germany's Next Topmodel.

Challenge winner: Hanna Bohnekamp, Laura Weyel & Neele Hehemann
Booked for job: Hanna Bohnekamp & Leyla Mert
Eliminated: Viktoria Lantratova
Featured photographer: Kristian Schuller
Guest judge: Cindy Crawford
Special guest: Thomas Gottschalk, Marco Kreuzpaintner

Episode 12: Heidi Klums Mädchen lernen fliegen
Original airdate: 22 May 2010

The episode started with a casting for a job on the opening of the new shop from famous model Helena Christensen. Alisar and Laura can once again deliver while Pauline finds herself in the lucky position to book her first job in the competition. Instead of a photo shoot a video shoot was arranged where the girls had to run down a street and fall on a mat. Most of the girls impressed and Alisar, Leyla and Pauline got acclaim for their professional behavior. Although almost bursting in tears for another time, Hanna made an overall good impression on the commercial shoot as well. On a second casting the remaining seven had the chance to get booked for a ten pages spread in German magazine Cosmopolitan. The friends Hanna and Neele were successful together with Laura, much to the dissatisfaction of Louisa, the only other remaining blonde in the competition. At the weekly judging panel the girls had to learn a dance with sticks from their runway trainer Jorge. Particularly Neele had a lot of problems and was not happy with it, however she was sent onto the next round together with the other six girls making it a non-elimination-round.

Booked for casting: Alisar Ailabouni, Pauline Afaja, Laura Weyel, Hanna Bohnekamp, Neele Hehemann & Laura Weyel
Eliminated: None
Featured director: Thomas Job
Guest judge: Jorge Gonzales
Special guest: Helena Christensen

Episode 13: Heidi Klum verwöhnt ihre Mädchen
Original airdate: 29 May 2010

Challenge winner: Alisar Ailabouni & Leyla Mert
Cast for job: Louisa Mazzurana
Eliminated: Leyla Mert & Pauline Afaya 
Featured director & guest judge: Gilles Bensimon

Episode 14: Covergirl
Original airdate: 3 June 2010

In the week of the last elimination before the final Alisar set herself in pole-position by being booked for an international campaign for Sony Ericsson. At the cover shoot for German Cosmopolitan, which will be one of the prizes the winner receives, Laura amazed Heidi and the photographer with her Cameron Diaz-like smile and Neele struggled with her tears when thinking of her boyfriend. As a reward for their journey so far the girls were invited by Heidi to attend a concert by The Black Eyed Peas in the backstage lounge. While Alisar shot her commercial the remaining four girls participated in a stunt interview challenge in which Laura was declared the winner. Hanna on the other hand bursted out in tears again after realizing how limited her English is. Before the elimination the top 5 got one more chance to work on their walks in a runway lesson with coach Jorge Gonzalez. At the judging panel the girls had to walk in two rounds in Prêt-à-porter and Haute Couture before receiving a video message from their family and friends. While everyone thought that the final 3 would be determined only Louisa is sent home. In the end Heidi announced that the final 4 will travel to Milan for a runway show before the real semi-final will take place.

Featured photographer: Mark Liddell
Guest judge: Petra Winter
Special guest: The Black Eyed Peas
Booked for job: Alisar Ailabouni
Challenge winner: Laura Weyel
Eliminated: Louisa Mazzurana

Episode 15: Es wird spannend - Das Semifinale
Original airdate: 9 June 2010

In the beginning the remaining four girls were informed by Heidi to shave their legs as they were about to shoot the commercial and print campaign for Gillette Venus which will be part of the prizes for the winner. On a sunny beach the shooting consisted of two parts: One with a male model and one which included speaking. Then they had a photo shoot with Kristian Schuller in which they first had to jump and move in blankets before getting overwhelmed with powder. Only Neele struggled in the beginning of the shoot while both Hanna and Alisar surprised with their newly found confidence and outgoing behavior. After the departure from their loft in Los Angeles the girls traveled to Milan. On a runway show for a well known designer they were surprised by their families and friends who were sitting in the audience. At the judging panel the jury took a look on the development of each of the four girls during the competition. Neele was eliminated despite her edgy and high fashion look as she was struggling with the commercial aspect that is required to become Germany's Next Topmodel.

Eliminated: Neele Hehemann
 Featured director: Ben Hartenstein
Featured photographer: Kristian Schuller

Episode 16: Das Finale
Original airdate: 10 June 2010

Laura, who was booked for four jobs, is eliminated first, what leaves Hanna, who was booked for three jobs, and Alisar, who was booked for 5 jobs. After a last walk and a photoshoot Alisar is declared Germany's Next Topmodel.

Final three: Alisar Ailabouni, Hanna Bohnekamp & Laura Weyel
Eliminated: Laura Weyel
Final two: Alisar Aliabouni & Hanna Bohnekamp 
Germany's Next Topmodel: Alisar Aliabouni
Special guests: Lena Gercke, Collien Fernandes, Katy Perry, Kylie Minogue

Contestants
(ages stated are at start of contest)

Summaries

Results table

 The contestant was in danger of elimination
 The contestant was eliminated
 The contestant withdrew from the competition
 The contestant won the competition

Photo shoot guide
 Episode 1 photo shoot: Emotions 
 Episode 2 photo shoot: Celebrity wax figures
 Episode 3 photo shoot: Conveyor belt  at the airport
 Episode 4 photo shoot: Couture gymnastics on pull-Up rings
 Episode 5 photo shoot: Arrested by the NYPD
 Episode 6 photo shoot: Swimsuits with a male model
 Episode 7 photo shoot: Fire over the Los Angeles skyline
 Episode 8 photo shoot: Seaweed bikinis on the beach
 Episode 9 photo shoot: Lingerie under the covers
 Episode 10 photo shoot: Winter birds
 Episode 11 photo shoot: Circus couture 
 Episode 12 video shoot: Shopping madness
 Episode 13 photo shoot: Covered in mud
 Episode 14 photo shoot: Cosmopolitan covers
 Episode 15 commercial: Gillette venus
 Episode 15 photo shoots: Beauty shots in blankets; covered in powder

References

External links 
 

Germany's Next Topmodel
2010 German television seasons
Television shows filmed in South Africa
Television shows filmed in New York City
Television shows filmed in California
Television shows filmed in Italy